The Little Darling is a 1909 comedy short produced by the Biograph Company of New York and directed by D. W. Griffith. It was released to theaters on a split-reel with Griffith's eleven-minute drama The Sealed Room. The production was filmed in two daysJuly 27 and August 3, 1909and at two locations: on interior sets in Biograph's Manhattan studio at 11 East 14th Street and on location at Cuddebackville, New York.

Preserved from a paper print.

Cast
Mary Pickford - 
Mack Sennett -
John R. Cumpson -
Owen Moore - 
Arthur V. Johnson -

References

External links
The Little Darling at IMDb.com
The Little Darling available for free download at Internet Archive

1909 films
American silent short films
Films directed by D. W. Griffith
Biograph Company films
1909 comedy films
American black-and-white films
1909 short films
American comedy short films
Silent American comedy films
1900s American films